The 13th Secretariat of the Communist Party of the Soviet Union was elected by the 1st Plenary Session of the  13th Central Committee, in the immediate aftermath of the 13th Congress.

Full members

Candidate members

References

Secretariat of the Central Committee of the Communist Party of the Soviet Union members
1924 establishments in the Soviet Union
1925 disestablishments in the Soviet Union